Allopodocotyle is a genus of trematodes in the family Opecoelidae.

Species
Allopodocotyle argyropsi Madhavi, 1975
Allopodocotyle atzi (Nigrelli, 1939) Pritchard, 1966
Allopodocotyle enkaimushi Blend, Kuramochi & Dronen, 2015
Allopodocotyle epinepheli (Yamaguti, 1942) Pritchard, 1966
Allopodocotyle heronensis Downie & Cribb, 2011
Allopodocotyle israelensis (Fischthal, 1980) Bray, 1987
Allopodocotyle jaffensis (Fischthal, 1980) Bray, 1987
Allopodocotyle lepomis (Dobrovolny, 1939) Pritchard, 1966
Allopodocotyle lethrini (Yamaguti, 1942) Pritchard, 1966
Allopodocotyle lutianusi Gupta & Ahamad, 1977
Allopodocotyle manteri (Saoud & Ramadan, 1984) Cribb, 2005
Allopodocotyle margolisi Gibson, 1995
Allopodocotyle mecopera (Manter, 1940) Pritchard, 1966
Allopodocotyle pedicellata (Stossich, 1887) Pritchard, 1966
Allopodocotyle plectropomi (Manter, 1963) Pritchard, 1966
Allopodocotyle pritchardae Madhavi, 1975
Allopodocotyle recifensis Bray, 1987
Allopodocotyle serrani (Yamaguti, 1952) Pritchard, 1966
Allopodocotyle skoliorchis Aken'Ova, 2003
Allopodocotyle tamame (Yamaguti, 1942) Pritchard, 1966
Allopodocotyle tunisiensis Derbel & Neifar, 2009
Allopodocotyle virens (Sinitsin, 1931) Pritchard, 1966

References

Opecoelidae
Plagiorchiida genera